"Did I Let You Know" is a song from the Red Hot Chili Peppers' 2011 album I'm with You and was released in January 2012 as a radio-only single exclusively in Brazil.

On December 13, 2011, the band released a statement on their Brazilian website saying due to the song getting heavy radio airplay in Brazil and the song winning a poll voted on by the fans they decided to make it the next single there. This is the first single chosen by the fans.

Music video

Although not officially released by the band, in response to being allowed to select the song as a single, a music video was released on March 9, 2012 and created by a group of Brazilian fans. The video has since been endorsed by Warner Brazil. The music video is inspired by the album's artwork along with the websites lettheflyknow.com and amoscasabe.com. Through the project “A Mosca Sabe” (The Fly Knows) fans from all over the country were selected to be part of the video. The devoted fans then got together in the city of Rio de Janeiro to shoot the video. Chad Smith and Josh Klinghoffer responded to the video with Smith saying "The Did I Let You Know video. Made by our Brazilian fans is very cool! I love it! Thanks so much!”  while Klinghoffer responded by saying “I just wanted to say that the smiles on all of those beautiful faces and the love that is very clear throughout that video made me a very, very happy camper.”

MTV Brasil aired the video on Monday March 19, 2012 on the show, Acesso MTV and interview those that helped create it.

Personnel

Red Hot Chili Peppers
Anthony Kiedis – lead vocals
Josh Klinghoffer – guitar, backing vocals
Flea – bass
Chad Smith – drums

Additional musicians
Mike Bulger – trumpet

References

2012 singles
Red Hot Chili Peppers songs
Warner Records singles
2011 songs
Song recordings produced by Rick Rubin
Songs written by Flea (musician)
Songs written by Anthony Kiedis
Songs written by Chad Smith
Songs written by Josh Klinghoffer